TACAM may refer to:
 Tactical Assault Camouflage, a US camouflage pattern 
 Tun anticar pe afet mobil (Romanian for "Anti-tank gun on mobile gun carriage") 
TACAM R-2, Romanian-produced World War II tank destroyer
TACAM T-60, Romanian-produced World War II tank destroyer
TACAM R-1, Proposed Romanian World War II tank destroyer
TACAM T-38, Proposed Romanian World War II tank destroyer

See also
TACAMO